Bilimora is a city situated on the banks of the river Ambika, in Gandevi taluka & Navsari district of Gujarat state, in India. The city comes under the purview of the Surat Metropolitan Region. It is linked to Surat by SH 6 and SH 88.

A fleet of 50 vessels were stationed here, mostly sailboats, cargo vessels for trading and military vessels to secure the sea from the Portuguese, the Dutch and the French.

Geography 
Bilimora is the second largest city in the Navsari district after Navsari city. The city is supposed to have been surrounded by three rivers: Ambika from the north, Kaveri river from the south, and the Karera river passes close by.

People and culture 
Most of the population is of Gujarati, Marathi, Muslim and other north Indian states particularly that of Uttar pradesh and Bihar.

There were also a lot of Parsi in the town; now the Parsi population is not that significant, however there is still a street called 'Agiyari Mahollo' inhabited by Parsi.

Also, a large number of the Sikh community which were stationed there as part of a refugee camp during partition remain in Bilimora. Although Bilimora is situated in the state of Gujarat, it has a lot of cultural influence from Mumbai which is around 220 km away. It takes 3 hours by train and 4 hours by road to reach Mumbai from Bilimora.

Transport 
Bilimora is well connected through road, rail & sea. It takes 3 hours maximum by train and 4 to 5 hours by road from Mumbai. The closest domestic & international airport is Surat International Airport, the airport is 79.4 km north-west from Bilimora, located in Surat city. The other international airport is Chhatrapati Shivaji Maharaj International Airport, the airport is 213.8 km south from Bilimora, located in Mumbai.

Bilimora is the only rail junction in the Mumbai division line of the Western Railway (India), from which a narrow gauge line separates from the broad line to arrive at Waghai in the Dang District. It is said to be that this narrow gauge line is to be converted into broad gauge and will be extended up to Manmad. Bilimora will be well connected through Maharashtra; the survey has been done and the project is to be evaluated for estimate. The town of Chikhli is about 10 km to the east, which is on National Highway 8.

It is directly connected to Saputara - a hill station in Gujarat - by bus. The buses come from Bilimora and also from Surat to Nasik or Pune via Bilimora - Saputara.

The town is about 25 km north of the city of Valsad and about 25 km south of the district headquarters Navsari.

Banks & ATM
Bilimora has all major banks, including: Dena bank, the Bank of Baroda, the Federal Bank, HDFC Bank, ICICI Bank, IDBI Bank, Indusland Bank, Punjab National Bank, the State Bank of India and the Union Bank of India. There is also one peoples' bank called The Gandevi Peoples' Bank. ATMs from these major banks are available in Bilimora.

Popular places

Bilimora is a small city with lot of temples, such as the Sri Jalaram mandir, the Sri Gayatri mandir, the Sri Dvarkadhish mandir, Swaminarayan mandir, the Ganga Mata temple, Somnat Mahadev mandir, Ram mandir (Desra) and a Sikh Gurudwara on Gandevi road. Also,there The new inclusion is Sai mandir on Somnath road. There are also some Muslim mosques in Billinaka

Saputara and Dang District Tourism:
Saputara, the only hill station in Gujarat, is around 110 km away from Bilimora. One can visit Waghai, Saputara, Gira falls in Dang District, India via a one-day road trip from Bilimora.

Unai hot springs are another popular place. Many local people believe in the legend of Sri Ram which is linked to the hot springs. Unai is about 40 km from Bilimora. The nearest railway station is Waghai. The narrow gauge rail link connecting Ahwa to Bilimora runs through the park.

Other Temples near Bilimora:

Jayantibhai L Mistry (1937) Fmr CMD LMP Precesion Engg Co. Ltd. Udyog Ratan & IBC Business Man Of The Decade.
 Mehboob Khan (1907-1964) - Pioneer Producer-Director of Hindi Cinema
 A. M. Naik (b. 1942) - Group Executive Chairman of Larsen & Toubro
 Shailesh Nayak (b. 1953) - Former Chairman of ISRO India

Hospitals
New Atrik Hospital, Navjivan Colony
Arpan Hospital, Nursery Road
Snehal Hospital, Navjivan Colony
Panchal Orthopedic Hospital, Tower Rd, Maruti Nagar Society
Littlestar Children Hospital, Sankalp Society
Adarsh Hospital, Somnath Road
Gupta hospital, Near Railway Station
Mandaliya Hospital, Sardar market road
Samved Hospital, Somnath Road
Shaishav Children Hospital, Gabba Estate
Sparsh Children Hospital, Somnath Road

References

Cities and towns in Navsari district
Ports and harbours of Gujarat